Jefferson, Virginia may refer to:
Jefferson, Powhatan County, Virginia
the former name for West Falls Church, Virginia